Yusuf Yasin (also known as Yousuf Yassin; 1888 – 19 April 1962) was a journalist and politician who served in various capacities during the reign of King Abdulaziz and King Saud. He was among the advisers of King Abdulaziz who were employed to improve the decision-making process of the state. Yasin performed several roles in the Saudi government until 1958 when he was dismissed by Crown Prince Faisal.

Early life and education
Yusuf Yasin was born in Latakia, Syria, in 1888. His parents were Fatima bint Abdullah Jamal and Shaikh Mohammad Yasin, and his grandfather was Ali Al Masri, an Egyptian immigrant to Syria.

Following religious education in Latakia Yasin graduated from the University of Jerusalem in 1911.

Career and activities
Yasin worked as a teacher in Jerusalem during the Ottoman period. During World War I he began to support the pan-Arab views. In 1917 he joined the service of Amir Faisal, son of Hussein bin Ali, King of Hejaz, and continued to serve him until next year. In 1920 Yasin began to work for Hussein bin Ali in Mecca who sent him to his another son Abdullah, Amir of Transjordan. However, he left Abdullah's service just six months after his appointment. Yasin cofounded a weekly nationalist newspaper in Jerusalem in 1921. His business associate was Mohammad Kamil Al Budari, and their paper was entitled Al Sabah. 

Yasin began to work for the House of Saud in 1923 or in 1924. Shukri Al Quwatli, future president of Syria, was instrumental in Yasin's new career. Yasin intended to work as a teacher for the sons of King Abdulaziz. He first became the head of the political section of the royal court and private secretary to the King.

In 1925 Yasin contributed to the establishment of a weekly paper in Mecca, Umm Al Qura, of which he became the first editor-in-chief. The paper soon functioned as the official gazette of the country. In 1926 he was made the political secretary of King Abdulaziz and then, appointed an adviser to him in the 1930s. On 29 December 1930 Yasin became a Saudi citizen. He suggested the addition of the phrase al-Sa’udiyyah to the name of the country, Al-Mamlakah al-'Arabiyyah al-Sa’udiyyah, known as Saudi Arabia, in 1932. In 1937 he was part of the Saudi delegation who visited London to attend the coronation of King George VI. The same year while officially visiting Baghdad, Iraq, upon the request of King Abdulaziz Yasin attempted to contact with a German arms company owned by Otto Wolff to buy rifles. During the same visit Yasin met with Fritz Grobba, Nazi Germany's ambassador to Iraq.

Yasin signed the extradition treaty between Kuwait and Saudi Arabia on behalf of the latter that established the Saudi–Kuwaiti neutral zone in 1942. The same year Yasin was the Saudi Arabian representative at the Arab League meeting in Alexandria, Kingdom of Egypt. He accompanied King Abdulaziz in his meeting with Franklin D. Roosevelt on 14 February 1945. Yasin signed a treaty of amity on behalf of Saudi Arabia with the Republic of China on 15 November 1946.

Yasin replaced Fuad Hamza as deputy foreign minister in 1951 when Hamza died. Between 1952 and 1955 Yasin was responsible for Saudi activities in the Buraimi Oasis and was a member of the Buraimi Arbitration Tribunal. Following the death of King Abdulaziz, Yasin served as the state minister and the advisor to King Saud, successor of the king. It was Yusuf Yasin who made an inauguration speech at the meeting of the council of ministers in the Murabba Palace on 7 March 1954. On 15 May 1958 Yasin was removed from the post by Crown Prince Faisal.

Views
Yasin had a pan-Arab stance, and one of his close companions was Rashid Rida, founder and editor of an influential conservative Egyptian publication, Al Manar. In fact, Rida was Yasin's teacher. Yasin was a major opponent of the close relations between Saudi Arabia and the United States, and also, had an anti-British approaches.

Personal life and death
Yasin married twice and had eight children, five sons and three daughters. One of his sons, Anas Yasin, was Saudi ambassador to the United Nations, India, and Turkey. His other son, Hassan Yasin, was the advisor to the former Saudi foreign minister Saud bin Faisal Al Saud.

Yusuf Yasin died of cardiac arrest in Dhahran on 19 April 1962.

Legacy
Joseph A. Kechichian wrote a book about Yusuf Yasin: The Arab Nationalist Advisor. Shaykh Yusuf Yassin of Sa’udi Arabia, which was released in December 2021.

References

20th-century newspaper founders
Yasin
1888 births
1962 deaths
Government ministers of Saudi Arabia
Yasin
People from Latakia
Yasin
Yasin
Yasin
Hebrew University of Jerusalem alumni